The Chief of Defence is a position in the military of Luxembourg and head of the Luxembourg Army. The Chief of Defence is the professional head of the armed forces, and in charge of the day-to-day operation. The current Chief of Defence is Steve Thull.

He is formally subordinate to the Grand Duke, whom the Constitution names as the commander-in-chief, but answers to the Minister for Defence in the civilian government.

List of Chiefs of Defence

 Source: Army of Luxembourg

Footnotes

Luxembourg
Military of Luxembourg
1960s establishments in Luxembourg